The President of the Chamber of Education and Culture was the presiding officer of the Chamber of Education and Culture of the Federal Assembly of Yugoslavia.

Office-holders
Nikola Sekulić
Đuro Kladarin 
Avguštin Lah (1969 – 1974)

Sources
Various editions of The Europa World Year Book

Chamber of Education and Culture, Pres
Yugoslavia, Chamber of Education and Culture